Gran Via de les Corts Catalanes ("Great Way of the Catalan Courts"), more simply known as Gran Via , is one of Barcelona's major avenues.

Location
It crosses the entire city proper, stretching from the North-Eastern boundaries of the municipality, bordering Sant Adrià de Besòs, to its South-Western limits, in L'Hospitalet de Llobregat, with some of Barcelona's most important squares in between: Plaça d'Espanya, Plaça Universitat, Plaça de Catalunya, Plaça de Tetuan and Plaça de les Glòries Catalanes. It's over thirteen kilometres long.

History
The late 19th century urban planner Ildefons Cerdà included it as an essential part of his draft of the new "Projecte de reforma i eixample de Barcelona" (nowadays simply known as "Pla Cerdà"), as a wide road linking a number of villages around the coastal part of Barcelona, and called it Lletra N, Número 11. It was renamed Corts in 1900, as a reference to the Medieval and Early Modern Catalan Courts. Later on, after the Second Spanish Republic was proclaimed in 1931, it was again renamed as Corts Catalanes. With the Francoist victory after the Civil War, its name was changed to Avenida de José Antonio Primo de Rivera in 1939. With the restoration of democracy, its name became Gran Via de les Corts Catalanes in 1979.

Transportation
The first line in the Barcelona metro system, built in the 1920s under the name "Gran Metro", covered the distance between Plaça Catalunya and Plaça Espanya, which is nowadays part of Line 1.

There are several metro stations located on Gran Via nowadays.
 Ildefons Cerdà (L8)
 Magòria-La Campana (L8)
 Espanya (L1, L3, L8)
 Rocafort (L1)
 Urgell (L1)
 Universitat (L1, L2)
 Passeig de Gràcia (L2, L3, L4)
 Tetuan (L2)
 Glòries (L1)
 Besòs (L4)

Lines T5 and T6 of the Trambesòs tram system also run through its northernmost third. Line H12 of Barcelona's BRT network traverses Gran Via on its entirety.

Places of note
 Cinema Coliseum
 A 2001 monument to the victims of Fascist Italian aviation bombings during the Spanish Civil War, opposite Cinema Coliseum.
 Font de Diana, a noucentista monument representing goddess Diana by Venanci Vallmitjana (1911–1929)
 Plaça de les Glòries Catalanes
 Banco Vitalicio Building
 Homage to books, monument by Joan Brossa in reference to the annual Book Fair in the Passeig de Gràcia with Gran Via de les Corts Catalanes.
 The Plaza Monumental de Barcelona
 Plaça de la Universitat
 Plaça d'Espanya
 Plaça de Tetuan
 Ciutat de la Justícia de Barcelona i l'Hospitalet de Llobregat

See also
Ildefons Cerdà
Eixample, List of streets and squares in Eixample
Barcelona

 Street names in Barcelona
 Urban planning of Barcelona

References

External links
City map of Barcelona

 
Streets in Barcelona
Odonyms referring to a building
Sants-Montjuïc
Eixample
Sant Martí (district)